Beyond Good formerly Madécasse, is a Brooklyn-based chocolate and vanilla company established in 2006 by two Peace Corps volunteers who served in Madagascar. The company sells a range of single origin chocolate bars and vanilla products, sourced from the island of Madagascar, and introduced a new line of Ugandan chocolate bars in early 2020. All of the cocoa is certified direct trade and is sourced directly from Malagasy and Ugandan cocoa farmers. For several years, Beyond Good worked with a local chocolate producer in Antananarivo before moving production to its own facility in Madagascar as well as in Europe.

History
Founders Brett Beach and Tim McCollum met while serving as Peace Corps volunteers in Madagascar. After spending a combined eight years on the island, McCollum and Beach recognized the need for a business model that worked toward impactful social and environmental change. Cocoa had always been a major export of Madagascar but very little chocolate was being produced on the island, much like the rest of Africa. Even though the continent was growing over 65% of the world's cocoa, less than 1% of the world's chocolate was being produced there. Beach and McCollum were determined to have an impact on the island, and created a business model to produce chocolate on the island so that the majority of the economic benefit would stay within the country. They reunited back in the United States and started the company at Beach's residence in Lawrence, Kansas.

They partnered with cocoa farmers of the Ezaka Cooperative, from a remote area of Madagascar. The company initially had trouble meeting the quality standards of the United States, as the cocoa beans needed more fermentation and drying. McCollum said, “You have farmers farming cocoa who have never eaten chocolate.” The farmers received training, equipment was purchased, and a bonus program for the company was developed. Since the company established a consistent process for producing high quality cocoa, it has received critical acclaim for its chocolates. According to Malagasy-born Michaël Chauveau, Director of Operations in Madagascar, Beyond Good partnered with a factory on the island that has steadily increased their production outcome. As the company expanded, it ventured out and partnered with more farming cooperatives in order to meet the rising demand.

There was room for growth in other markets besides chocolate, as Madagascar provided 60% of the world's vanilla beans. Beyond Good exports vanilla beans and extract from Madagascar to replicate the effect that they have with their chocolate bars in the vanilla sector. Currently, Beyond Good has offices in Brooklyn, managed by McCollum, and Madagascar.

In January 2020, the company officially changed its name from Madécasse to Beyond Good.

Recognition
In 2010, Beyond Good made its way to the 40 Under 40 list of people changing the way Americans eat and drink by Food & Wine. In 2011, it was listed as one of the World's 50 Most Innovative Companies by Fast Company. Beyond Good was named a Leader of Global Change in 2012 by the United Nations and Foundation for Social Change. In the same year, the brand also won the Good Food Award in the Chocolate category. In 2022, it received the Good Egg Award on the 2022 Chocolate Scorecard for its work with human rights and environmental issues such as traceability and transparency, living income, child labour, deforestation and climate, agroforestry and agrochemical management.

References

American chocolate companies
Manufacturing companies based in New York City
Agriculture in Madagascar
Companies based in Brooklyn